Grocott is a surname. Notable people with the surname include:

Ann Grocott (born 1938), Australian writer and painter
Bruce Grocott, Baron Grocott PC (born 1940), Labour Party politician in the United Kingdom
Harold Grocott (1876–1960), New Zealand lawn bowls player
Kevin Grocott (born 1992), English footballer who plays as a right back

See also
Grocott's methenamine silver stain, abbreviated GMS, a popular staining method in histology